The men's 400 metres at the 2022 World Athletics Championships was held at the Hayward Field in Eugene from 17 to 22 July 2022.

Summary

The semi final took every athlete who broke 45 seconds into the final.  By contrast, in 2015, sixteen athletes broke 45 in the semi final round. 2015 was the second World Chammpionships for two of the finalists, both former champions, Kirani James and world record holder Wayde van Niekerk.  After what should have been a career ending knee injury, it was remarkable for van Niekerk to get this far, each race an experiment to see how fast he could still go.  The 2022 world leader was Michael Norman at 43.56. In two previous major championships, 2019 and the Olympics, Norman had failed to win, so he had something to prove here too.

Norman went out fast, but James was marginally faster through the entire first half of the race.  Christopher Taylor, Matthew Hudson-Smith and van Niekerk were just a tick back.  James maintained his slight edge through the turn, when they hit the straight, Norman accelerated, putting a gap on van Niekerk and Hudson-Smith, but James didn't go away.  Norman battled, gaining a slight advantage, then widening it to a full meter by the finish.  Two meters back, Hudson-Smith had gained the advantage over van Niekerk whose form broke down the last 25 meters.  Coming from dead last off the turn, Champion Allison blazed by van Niekerk but came up short to catch Hudson-Smith for bronze.

Records
Before the competition records were as follows:

Qualification standard
The standard to qualify automatically for entry was 44.90.

Schedule
The event schedule, in local time (UTC−7), was as follows:

Results

Heats 
The first 3 athletes in each heat (Q) and the next 6 fastest (q) qualify for the heats.

Semi-finals 
The first 2 athletes in each heat (Q) and the next 2 fastest (q) qualify to the final.

Final 
The final took place on 22 July at 19:35.

References

400
400 metres at the World Athletics Championships